Alexander Hug may refer to:

 Alexander Hug (ski mountaineer) (born 1975), Swiss ski mountaineer
 Alexander Hug (rugby union) (born 1984), German international rugby union player